; legally Estonian Theatrical Distribution OÜ) is an Estonian film distributor. The company was established by three former staff of Forum Cinemas (a subsidiary of Finnkino). It took over all Baltic rights of The Walt Disney Company, 20th Century Studios, Universal and Paramount films.

Activities outside Estonia  

Hea Film operates a film distribution business in Latvia through Labs Kino (legally Latvian Theatrical Distribution SIA) and in Lithuania through Du Kine (legally Theatrical Film Distribution UAB).

Distribution rights

References

External links 
  of Hea Film
  of Labs Kino
  of Du Kine

Film distributors
Cinema of Estonia